3-7-77 is a symbol originally used by the Montana Vigilantes, a 19th century vigilance committee in Virginia City, Montana, United States.

Historic examples

When the numbers "3-7-77" were painted on a tent or cabin, it was a warning that the occupants could face vigilantism if they did not leave the area.  In 1917, union organizer Frank Little was lynched, and a note pinned to his body read, "Others take notice, first and last warning, 3-7-77."

Modern examples
The numbers are used on the shoulder patch of the Montana Highway Patrol.  The Association of Montana Troopers website says the patch:

The symbol appears on the flight suits of pilots of the Montana Air National Guard, and the flight patch of the Montana Army National Guard Medevac unit 1189th GSAB – Vigilantes.

The symbol is the logo of Big Sky Brewing Company of Missoula, Montana.

Some floats in the Vigilante Day Parade in Helena, Montana, display the numbers 3-7-77.

Origin 
Theories regarding the origin and meaning of the symbol include:
The numbers represent the date the Vigilante Oath was signed in Bannack, Montana, the first seat of Justice in the state.  This claim is perpetuated by a supposed oath, dated March 7, 1877, that hangs on the wall of the Masonic Lodge 3-7-77 in Bannack.
 The numbers represent the dimensions of a grave, 3 feet by 7 feet by 77 inches.
 Frederick Allen, in his book A Decent Orderly Lynching, says the number meant the person had to buy a $3 ticket on the next 7:00 a.m. stagecoach to take the 77-mile trip from Helena to Butte.
 The number set may have something to do with the date March 7, 1877.  The numbers may have been first used during that decade, but did not appear in print until the 19th century.  The first Masonic meeting in Bannack, Montana is sometimes said to have taken place on March 7, 1877, but there is no historic evidence for this claim.  The same source (the Bannack State Park Guide) also claims that in 1874, realizing the need for a school, the Bannack Masonic Lodge 16 built a combination lodge building and school. However, this would mean that the first Masonic meeting in Bannack was held well before March 7, 1877.  The Bannack Masons actually applied for a charter for a Masonic Lodge in 1863.  Bannack Lodge 16 was chartered in 1871, and remained open until 1921, when it consolidated with the Dillon Masonic Lodge.  Hence, the date theory does not stand.  In 2000 Bannack Historic Lodge 3-7-77 was organized through the Grand Lodge of Montana.

References

Pre-statehood history of Montana
Vigilantism in the United States
American frontier
Law enforcement in Montana